Floyd Breeland (August 5, 1933 – August 11, 2020) was an American politician who served in the South Carolina House of Representatives from the 111th district from 1992 to 2008. Breeland was born in St. George, South Carolina and served in the United States Army. He received his bachelor's degree from Allen University and his master's degree from Indiana University. He was a high school teacher and principal.

He died on August 11, 2020, in Charleston, South Carolina at age 87.

References

1933 births
2020 deaths
People from St. George, South Carolina
Military personnel from South Carolina
Allen University alumni
Indiana University alumni
Schoolteachers from South Carolina
Democratic Party members of the South Carolina House of Representatives